Surya Dev Sharma was a Hindu leader and Trustee of Shri Peetambra Peeth Datia. He also founded Arya Veer Dal, an organisation for young Hindus.

Surya Dev Sharma was from the village of Kathaout in Ghazipur district, Uttar Pradesh.  

He entered Hindu politics in Gwalior State under the patronage of Jiwaji Rao Scindhia, the Maharaja of Gwalior. He was elected a municipal councillor and twice elected as a Member of Legislative Assembly in Madhya Pradesh, firstly from Sewdha and then from Datia.

He left politics  on the orders of Shri Guru Maharaj. After leaving politics, Sharma was appointed caretaker of the religious peeth Shri Peetambara Peth in Datiya by his spiritual guide, Guru Maharaj.

Notes 

Hindu activists